Johnson Hollow Brook is a river in Delaware County, New York. It flows into the Schoharie Creek northwest of Prattsville.

References

Rivers of New York (state)
Rivers of Delaware County, New York
Rivers of Greene County, New York